ON 207 was a North Atlantic convoy of the ONS/ON series which ran during the Battle of the Atlantic in World War II. It was the subject of a major U-boat attack in October 1943, the fourth battle in the German autumn offensive.

Background

Still believing their new weapons and tactics gave them an advantage, despite the losses suffered by wolfpack Schlieffen and unaware of the poor results achieved during its attack on convoys ONS 20 and ON 206,
Befehlshaber der Unterseeboote (BdU) re-organized the boats then in the North Atlantic into patrol line Siegfried to continue the offensive. The next convoy subjected to an attack was ON 207.

Protagonists
ON 207 departed Liverpool on 18 October 1943, bound for New York.
and the Merchant aircraft carrier Amastra, though she had to return to base early in the voyage with storm damage.

BdU had established the patrol line Seigfried of 18 boats.
It consisted of 7 boats from the disbanded group Schlieffen, plus 11 others from bases in France and Germany. All the reinforcements were commanded by new skippers; 6 from Norway were also new boats, while the 5 from France were experienced boats with new commanders. 
The Siegfried boats had fuel problems, so a re-fueling group was established north of the Azores, of 3 U-tankers and a flak boat as escort.

When Allied intelligence learned of the position of Seigfried, it was decided to force an engagement with the wolfpack; several HX and SC convoys in the area were diverted away, whilst ON 207 was left to continue on course, as a bait convoy for the U-boats. ON 207 was massively reinforced by two support groups, 2nd EG  commanded by Capt FJ Walker, and B-7 EG, commanded by Cdr P Gretton, which detached from a successful trip with ON 206.
was accompanied by the escort carrier . (Two of 2EG's sloops were absent at the time). 
B-7 also had 2 corvettes detached.

The Action

On 23 October 1943  was sighted by a B-24 Liberator of No. 224 Squadron RAF attempting to make contact with the convoy. The  Liberator attacked, and was joined by escorts  Vidette and Duncan of B-7. They also attacked with depth charges, and U-274 was destroyed with all hands.

On 26 October  was attacked by a Liberator of No. 10 Squadron RCAF, but she escaped with little damage. Later in the day, another Liberator of 10 Squadron attacked and destroyed .

On 29 October B 7 detached to join ON 208, which was following several days behind; the group found  shadowing the convoy. Duncan, Vidette and Sunflower attacked with depth charges and Hedgehog, and U-282 was destroyed with all hands.

During the time ON 207 was in Siegfrieds patrol area, none of its boats were able to launch an attack, and none of ON 207s ships were harmed by enemy action.

Later that day, the destroyer  destroyed  in a 72-minute duel, that also saw Borie fatally damaged, sinking later that day.

ON 207 continued to its destination, arriving at New York on 4 November 1943.

Conclusion

With 3 U-boats destroyed for no ships lost ON 207 was undoubtedly an Allied victory; but if Admiralty was hoping to inflict a crushing blow to UbW by wiping out an entire wolf pack, this success eluded them.
Most of the U-boats were unable to make contact, and those that did were unable to shadow effectively in order to bring the pack together. Possibly the escorts were unfamiliar with their role as bait, and were too efficient at keeping the pack away from the convoy.

Following ON 207 BdU re-configured Siegfried to form 3 sub-groups to cover a wider area, but this failed to produce results. Also BdU was realizing that the new weapons and tactics underpinning the Autumn offensive were not being successful; and following the attack on ON 207 no further North Atlantic convoys were seriously harmed.

Table

U-boats destroyed

External links
ON 207 on Convoyweb

References
Clay Blair : Hitler's U-Boat War [Volume 2]: The Hunted 1942–1945 (1998)  (2000 UK paperback ed.)
Peter Gretton : Convoy Escort Commander (1964).ISBN (none)
Arnold Hague : The Allied Convoy System 1939–1945 (2000).  (Canada).  (UK)
Paul Kemp  : U-Boats Destroyed  ( 1997). 
Axel Neistle  : German U-Boat Losses during World War II  (1998). 
Stephen Roskill : The War at Sea 1939–1945   Vol III(1959).ISBN (none)

ON207
Naval battles of World War II involving Canada